Shark chutney is a dish eaten in the Seychelles. It typically consists of 2 lbs (907.2 grams) of boiled skinned shark, finely mashed, and cooked with squeezed bilimbi juice and lime. This in turn is mixed with onion, pepper, salt and turmeric. The onion is fried and it is cooked in oil.

See also
 Cuisine of Seychelles

References

Seychellois cuisine
Fish dishes